Khvoshab (also Romanized as Khvoshāb, Khooshab, Khūshāb, and Khush Āb) is a village in Doreh Rural District, in the Central District of Sarbisheh County, South Khorasan Province, Iran. At the 2006 census, its population was 206, in 46 families.

References 

Populated places in Sarbisheh County